Berghia columbina  is a species of sea slug, an aeolid nudibranch. It is a shell-less marine gastropod mollusc in the family Aeolidiidae.

Distribution
Originally described from the southwestern coast of the Iberian Peninsula, Atlantic Ocean. This species has been reported from the Mediterranean coast of Andalusia, southern Spain, southern Portugal  the Canary Islands, Senegal and the Atlantic coast of Morocco.

References

Aeolidiidae
Gastropods described in 1990